Joseph Francis Michael Morris (born September 13, 1955) is an American jazz guitarist, bassist, composer, and educator.

Early life
Morris was born in New Haven, Connecticut, on September 13, 1955. He switched from trumpet to guitar at the age of fourteen. He was self-taught. His interest in jazz began two years later, after attending a John McLaughlin concert and listening to John Coltrane, Miles Davis, and Pharoah Sanders recordings.

Later life and career
Morris moved to Boston in 1975, "where his unique approach was not initially accepted in the then-prevalent modal jazz scene. Despite this temporary setback, and some time spent playing guitar in Europe, he developed a pivotal collaborative relationship with multi-instrumentalist Lowell Davidson, whose unique sound explorations inspired him to further develop his own original approach to music making". Morris formed his first trio in 1977.

In 1981 Morris formed his own record company, Riti, for his own recordings. He has led a group called Sweatshop, the sextet Racket Club, and quartets featuring, separately, Mat Maneri, Jamie Saft, and Rob Brown.

In 1994 he became the first guitarist to lead his own session for Black Saint/Soul Note, with Symbolic Gesture. He has continued to record extensively for many labels such as Knitting Factory, AUM Fidelity, and Hathut. In addition to leading his own groups, he has recorded and performed with, among others: Matthew Shipp, William Parker, Joe Maneri, and Ivo Perelman.

He has lectured and conducted workshops throughout the US and Europe. He is a former member of the faculty of Tufts University Extension College and is on the faculty at New England Conservatory in the jazz and improvisation department.

Influences and style
Morris cites as influences Cecil Taylor, Eric Dolphy, Leroy Jenkins, Thelonious Monk, Jimi Hendrix, and West African string music. Morris has created his own approach to playing and composing. "He usually incorporates a clean tone of the bebop lineage for his single-note-driven improvisations".
He also plays banjolele.

Discography

As leader/co-leader

As sideman

Books
 Morris, Joe. Perpetual Frontier / The Properties of Free Music. Riti Publishing, 2012.

References

External links
 Official site
 A Fireside Chat With Joe Morris at All About Jazz
 Interview: Joe Morris by Phil Freeman at Burning Ambulance

1955 births
Living people
Avant-garde jazz musicians
American jazz guitarists
Musicians from New Haven, Connecticut
Guitarists from Connecticut
American male guitarists
20th-century American guitarists
Jazz musicians from Connecticut
20th-century American male musicians
American male jazz musicians
Clean Feed Records artists
Leo Records artists
AUM Fidelity artists
Knitting Factory Records artists
Black Saint/Soul Note artists
ESP-Disk artists
RogueArt artists
Okka Disk artists